The Smiley cookie is a trademarked cookie that is distributed by the Eat'n Park Corporation of Homestead, Pennsylvania through their restaurants and online business, smileycookie.com. The signature Smiley Cookie was adapted from a cookie an employee enjoyed as a child in Western PA. Eat'n Park began baking their version in  1986 and coincided with the addition of in-store bakeries at its locations. The Smiley Cookie was first produced by Warner's Bakery, a small bakery in Titusville, Pennsylvania. It was trademarked in 1987. The Smiley Cookie became so popular that it was added to the logo of Eat'n Park. A competitor, Kings Family Restaurants produced the "Frownie", a brownie decorated with a frowning face. The "Frownie" was discontinued in 2015 (later returned in early 2019) after Kings was sold to a private equity firm. Eat'n Park filed several lawsuits against companies outside the restaurants' operating area to enforce its trademark on the Smiley Cookie. The costumed Smiley cookie made appearances throughout the Pittsburgh region and travels in a 1974 DIVCO Milk truck, which is now a branded-van known as the "Cookie Cruiser". 

On December 31, 2010, the Eat'n Park corporation filed a federal lawsuit in Texas against Crumb Corps for infringing on the trademarked cookie.

The late singer songwriter Mac Miller, of Pittsburgh Pennsylvania, paid homage to the iconic cookie in 2010 by singing about it in his song “Knock Knock.” The line, which refers to being happy and smiling all the time, says “Keep a smile like an Eat’n Park cookie.”

References

External links
smileycookie.com
Smiley Cookie website

Desserts
Cookies
Culture of Pittsburgh